Collier Bay may refer to:

Collier Bay, Newfoundland, Canada
Collier Bay, Western Australia
Collier Bay (horse), a British racehorse